The Late Antique Little Ice Age (LALIA) was a long-lasting Northern Hemispheric cooling period in the 6th and 7th centuries AD, during the period known as Late Antiquity. The period coincides with three large volcanic eruptions in 535/536, 539/540 and 547. The volcanic winter of 536 was the early phenomenon of the century-long global temperature decline.

Eruptions
The existence of a cooling period was proposed as a theory in 2015, and subsequently confirmed as the period from 536 to about 660 CE. Volcanic eruptions, meteorites striking the earth's surface, and comet fragments exploding in the upper atmosphere have been proposed for the climatic cooling in 536 and afterwards.  A problem is that no impact crater for a meteorite has been found, even though the land area and sea beds have been well surveyed for evidence. A comet fragment half a kilometer in size exploding in the atmosphere could cause a plume of debris on the earth and create conditions for atmospheric cooling. Most evidence, however, points to volcanic eruptions occurring in 536, 540, and possibly 547, although the location of the volcano or volcanoes has not been determined. Locations such as Tavurvur in Papua New Guinea, Ilopango in El Salvador, and Krakatau in Indonesia have been proposed.

Investigations in 2018 analyzed ice cores from glaciers in Switzerland and matched glass particles in the cores with volcanic rocks from Iceland, making the island nation a likely candidate for the source of the 536 eruption, although North America is also a possible location. Evidence suggests that Ilopango in El Salvador was the source of the 539/540 eruption. Bipolar ice core investigations suggested that this eruption occurred in the tropics, and tree ring investigations near Ilopango found evidence of an eruption possibly in 540. However, a more recent study, examining other evidence, dated the eruption of Ilopango to the year 431, so the issue remains unresolved. The eruption, whatever its location, put more aerosols into the atmosphere than the 1815 eruption of Mount Tambora, which caused the Year Without a Summer. Another eruption, location unknown, occurred in 547. Additional evidence comes from a temperature reconstruction from the Euro-Med2k working group of the international PAGES (Past Global Changes) project that used new tree-ring measurements from the Altai Mountains, which closely matches the temperatures in the Alps in the last two centuries.

The impact of the volcanic eruptions was the phenomenon known as volcanic winter. In the volcanic winter of 536, summer temperatures fell by as much as 2.5 degrees Celsius (4.5 degrees Fahrenheit) below normal in Europe. ("Normal" is considered by scientists to be the average temperatures of the 1961–1990 period.) The lingering impact of the volcanic winter of 536 was augmented in 539–540, when the second volcanic eruption caused summer temperatures to decline as much as 2.7 degrees Celsius (4.9 degrees Fahrenheit) below normal in Europe.

While the volcanic eruptions began the freeze, researchers think that increased ocean ice cover (feedback to the effects of the volcanoes), coupled with an "exceptional" minimum of solar activity in the 600s, reinforced and extended the cooling.

Regional impacts

Middle East
According to research by a team from the Swiss Federal Research Institute at Birmensdorf, the fall in temperatures led to the Arabian Peninsula experiencing a dramatic increase in fertility. The boost of food supply contributed to the Arab expansion beyond the peninsula in the Islamic conquests. The cooling period also led to increased strain on the Eastern Roman Empire and the Sassanid Empire, which helped the Muslim conquest of the Levant, the Muslim conquest of Egypt and the Muslim conquest of Persia.

According to research done by Israeli scientists, in 540, the size of the population of the city of Elusa, in the Negev Desert, and the amount of garbage that it generated started to shrink greatly. Elusa housed tens of thousands of people during its height. The major decline took place around the mid-6th century, about a century before the Islamic conquest. One possible explanation for the crisis was the Late Antique Little Ice Age.

Mediterranean region
The cooling period coincided with the Plague of Justinian, which began in 541, though the connection between the plague and the volcanoes still remains tenuous.
The cooling period contributed to the migrations of the Lombards and the Slavs into Roman territory in Italy and the Balkans.

See also 
Migration Period
Little Ice Age
Maunder Minimum
Roman Warm Period

References

6th century
7th century
Ice ages
Late antiquity
Volcanic winters